Eco-town or ecotown may refer to:
Eco-municipality, a specific form of eco-town where ecological principles are formally incorporated into the conduct of local government
Eco-towns, proposed programme of new towns in England

See also
Ecovillage, an ecologically sustainable community
Sustainable city, or ecocity